Jack Delano (born Jacob Ovcharov; August 1, 1914 – August 12, 1997) was a Ukrainian immigrant who became an accomplished photographer for the Works Progress Administration, United Fund, and most notably, the Farm Security Administration (FSA). He wore many hats as he also was a composer known for his use of Puerto Rican folk material, started a television production company, and was a cartoonist, poet, moviemaker, professor, and architectural designer.

Early life
Delano was born Jacob Ovcharov (Cyrillic: Яков Овчаров) to a Jewish family in Voroshilovka, Podolia Governorate, Russian Empire (now Vorošýlivka, Ukraine). Delano, along with his parents and younger brother, emigrated to the United States in 1923. The family arrived in New York on July 5, 1923 on the SS Homeric, and settled in Philadelphia, Pennsylvania, soon after.

Between 1924 and 1932 Delano studied graphic arts/photography and music (viola and composition) as a scholarship student at the Settlement Music School. After graduating high school he attended the Pennsylvania Academy of the Fine Arts (PAFA) where he studied illustration and continued his musical training. While there, Delano was awarded the Cresson Traveling Scholarship, on which he chose to travel to Europe, where he bought a camera that got him interested in photography.

Career

Farm Security Administration

After graduating from the PAFA, Delano found it difficult to secure a career in painting, illustrating, or music, so he decided to look into a photography program he had heard about through the Federal Art Project (FAP). He had moved to New York and had been freelancing as a photographer at the time, and decided to propose a photographic project to the FAP.: a study of mining conditions in the Schuylkill County, Pennsylvania, anthracite coal area. Delano sent sample pictures to Roy Stryker and applied for a job at the Farm Security Administration Photography Program. Through the help of Edwin Rosskam and Marion Post Wolcott, Stryker offered Delano a job at $2,300/year in 1940. As a condition of the job, Delano had to have his own car and driver's license, both of which he acquired before moving to Washington, D.C.

Before working at the FSA, Delano had done his own processing and developing but did neither at the FSA. The FSA was created under the Roosevelt administration under the New Deal as a means to support small farmers and help restore the communities most affected by the depression. Many noteworthy photographers worked for the FSA until it was eliminated as "budget waste" in 1943 (including Esther Bubley, Marjory Collins, Walker Evans, Dorothea Lange, Russell Lee, Carl Mydans, Gordon Parks, Arthur Rothstein, Ben Shahn, John Vachon, and Marion Post Wolcott), but Delano’s work continually differed greatly from his colleagues. He generally focused more on cultural and social patterns of regions rather than focusing solely on the people and landscape.

World War II 
By the time the United States entered World War II, Delano completed a number of photo essays on industry in America preparing for the war. He was then drafted into the United States Army Air Corps and served in the South Pacific from 1943 to 1946. Throughout his time in the military he continued documenting his experience via films and photographs, many of which remain classified to this day. He came home a captain and was determined to move to Puerto Rico with his wife, Irene (a second cousin to fellow photographer Ben Shahn), a land both of them had fallen in love with.

Move to Puerto Rico 

Delano traveled to Puerto Rico in 1941 as a part of the FSA project. He was meant to spend a few days there on his way to the Virgin Islands, but his trip turned in to a few months due to the US declaring war after the Pearl Harbor bombing. This trip had such a profound influence on him that he settled there permanently in 1946. He mentioned being both fascinated and disturbed by the conditions he saw on the island, that he had never seen such intense poverty or met such kind people.

He became well known, well loved, and highly regarded on the island. There were few Puerto Ricans who did not know who he was, or interact with his work (illustrations, cartoons, movies, movies, musicals, etc.) in some way on a day-to-day basis.

With his wife he worked in the Community Division of the Department of Public Education producing films, for many of which Delano composed the score. Delano also directed Los Peloteros, a Puerto Rican film about poor rural kids and their love for baseball. The film remains a classic in Puerto Rican cinema.

Photography 

Delano's photography was highly regarded, not only for his unconventional subjects and locations, but because of his unconventional use of scale and proportion. This dramatically differentiated him from other FSA photographers. He used these techniques to dramatize the subject's presence and better underline the strength and character of the individual. He often took photos of the unsafe or poor conditions many individuals were living and working in. He used his photography to highlight the important of the "average" person as well as expose the conditions many of them were working in, in both the coal mines and Puerto Rico.

Musical works 
Delano's musical compositions included works of every type: orchestral (many composed for the Puerto Rico Symphony Orchestra), ballets (composed for Ballet Infantil de Gilda Navarra and Ballets de San Juan), chamber, choral (including Pétalo de rosa, a commission for Coro de Niños de San Juan) and solo vocal. His vocal music often showcases Puerto Rican poetry, especially the words of friend and collaborator Tomás Blanco. Blanco, Délano and his wife Irene collaborated on children's books. The most prominent of these remains a classic in Puerto Rican literature: The Child's Gift: A Twelfth Night Tale by Tomás Blanco, with illustrations by Irene Delano and incidental music (written on the margins) by Jack Delano.

His score for the film Desde las nubes demonstrates an early use of electronic techniques. Most of his works composed after he moved to Puerto Rico are notable for using folk material in a classical form.

Public television
Delano and two of his friends from the FSA, Edwin and Louise Rosskam, helped to create the Cinema and Graphics Unit (CGU, now known as the Division of Community Education) of the Commission of Parks and Recreation when asked by the governor to create a platform that would use film and graphics to improve education in rural areas. In 1957, they then founded Puerto Rico's first publicly funded educational television station, WIPR where Jack also acted as a station producer, composer, and program director. This started Jack's slow move away from photography and into creating in other areas.

WIPR produced many notable programs, including “Puerto Rico: Workshop for the Americas” in 1961 which shed a light on the importance of Puerto Rican development to the Americas, touched on the difference between Cuba (under Fidel Castro) and Puerto Rico and how peaceful the island is, and even secured an exclusive interview with Puerto Rican governor Luis Munoz Marin.

Selected compositions
 Orchestral
 Ofrenda Musical (Musical Offering) for viola, horn and string orchestra (1959)
 El sabio Doctor Mambú, Ballet for children (1962); libretto by the composer
 Concertino classico for C trumpet and small orchestra (1968)
 Sinfonietta for string orchestra (1983)
 Chamber and instrumental music
 Sonata in A minor for viola and piano (1953)
 Sonata for violin solo (1960)
 Sonatina for flute and piano (1965)
 String Quartet (1984)
 Tres preludios (3 Preludes) for piano (1985)
 "Aves" -10 piezas breves para piano (Rio Piedras, Puerto Rico 1987); Vocal
 Esta luna es mía for soprano solo, female chorus and piano (1962); words by José P.H. Hernández
 Me voy a Ponce for mixed chorus (1965); words by José Agustín Balseiro
 Tres cancioncitas del mar for medium voice and piano (1969); words by Nimia Vicéns, Ester Feliciano Mendoza and Carmelina Vizcarrondo
 Cuatro sones de la tierra for voice and piano (1974); words by Tomás Blanco
 Pétalo de rosa, Suite for a cappella children's choir (1993); written for the San Juan Children's Choir
 Film scores
 Los Peloteros (1953)
 Discography
 Al menos cantos (2022), released by Lexicon Classics, showcases 16 songs by Jack Délano, featuring mezzo-soprano Laura Virella, pianist Alla Milchtein and cellist Kate Dillingham.

Gallery

Death
Jack Delano died in San Juan on August 12, 1997 at age 83. He was buried at the Capital Municipal Cemetery in Río Piedras, Puerto Rico.

References

Bibliography
 H. Wiley Hitchcock and Stanley Sadie (eds), New Grove Dictionary of American Music, (London: Macmillan Press, 1986), volume 1, p 595.
 Composers of the Americas: biographical data and catalogs of their works, (Washington: Secretaría General, Organización de los Estados Americanos),  volume 19, pp 22–27.

External links

 
 Interview of Jack & Irene Delano by Richard Doud of the Archives of American Art, Smithsonian Institution (June 12, 1965)
 Photography of Jack Delano
 Bound for Glory, exhibit featuring color photographs by Delano and others.
 Handpicked selection of photographs at Shorpy
 Columbus Museum of Art Web page on Delano's 1940 photograph Miner at Dougherty's Mine, Near Falls Creek, Pennsylvania (click on picture for larger image)
 Portrait of an Artist: Jack Délano by Francisco J. Cabán-Vales, Musiké
 Cuatro sones de la tierra by mezzo-soprano Laura Virella and pianist Nathaniel LaNasa

1914 births
1997 deaths
20th-century American photographers
American classical violists
American male classical composers
American classical composers
American film score composers
American male film score composers
Puerto Rican music
Soviet emigrants to the United States
People from Vinnytsia Oblast
Pennsylvania Academy of the Fine Arts alumni
Puerto Rican people of Russian descent
United States Army Air Forces personnel of World War II
20th-century classical composers
20th-century American composers
20th-century American male musicians
American people of Ukrainian descent
20th-century violists